Mu Alpha Phi is a sorority established in Puerto Rico on October 24, 1927. 
 It is considered to be the first Puerto Rican sorority founded in the island.  The sorority has Alumni and University chapters across the Island and an Alumni chapter in Orlando, FL.

History
The sorority that pioneered the greek world movement for women in the island was established in the University of Puerto Rico, Río Piedras campus on October, 1927.  The founding sisters were: Carmen Rosa Janer, Laura Muñoz, Emma Colón, Aida González, María Padial, Carmen Belén Cruz, Alicia Rivero, Luz Vilá, María Luisa Márquez, Luz Vilariño, Georgina Pastor, Mercedes Fernández, Ramona Santana, Ligia Noya, María Antonieta Delgado, Laura Cesteros, Blanca Martorell, Dolores Gutiérrez de Arroyo, Encarnación Rodríguez, Celia Machese, Sofía Oronoz, Josefina Gutiérrez, Sara Irizarry, María Inés Dávila and Ana María Santana.  Since many sisters were graduating by 1930 the need for an alumni chapter was evident, thus the "Capitulo Pasivo" was founded; this chapter is now called Zona Alpha Alumnae.

By September 13, 1946 the Beta chapter was established at the College of Agriculture and Mechanic Arts in Mayagüez, Puerto Rico.  The first Beta sisters were Delia González, Maita Bravo, Andreita Martínez and Rochie Sabater. As a result of the Beta chapter, the Río Piedras university chapter came to be called Alpha chapter and the "Capitulo Pasivo" came to be called Alpha Alumnae.

In June 1950, sorority sisters at Universidad Católica de Santa María, later called Pontificia Universidad Catolica de Puerto Rico, organized the Gamma Chapter, its first president was Betty Zapater de McConnie.  The chapter was officially recognized by University Authorities by November 1955.  By the early sixties sisters at the Inter American University at San Germán organized the Delta Chapter, it was led by Martita Mercado, Sally Zaragoza, Laira González Rigau and Berníe Pabón, among others.

Two years later Mu sisters led by Leila Padilla de Balaguer and Katherine Morell de Domínguez at Arecibo requested a charter; it was granted and thus the Epsilon chapter came to be.  This chapter closed and was later re-opened in 1985.  Since so many chapters were being created by 1950 a central governing body was created called "Honorable Consejo Supremo". Its first president was Judith Mercader de Sifre.

Two alumni chapters, Chi Alumni in Cabo Rojo and Gamma Alumnae in Ponce, were established; both chapters were closed.  Nevertheless, Alumni Chapters or "Zonas" were then established for sisters who had graduated, were married, or had other interests than those of the student sisters.  The first "Zona" was established in Ponce by 1979 and called Zona Ponce.  In San Juan the Alumni chapter was reopened as Zona Alpha Alumnae. By 1985, the Zona Beta was founded in Mayagüez and in 1989, the Zona Epsilon was founded in Arecibo.  Furthermore, in 1992 Zona Phi Alpha was founded in San Juan, in 1993 the Zona in San Germán was founded: Zona Delta. The newest Zona was founded in October 2016 : Zona Orlando, counting with approximately 70 members living in Florida. The sorority has many notable members such as Lueny Morell, Engineer and Professor of Chemical Engineering; Rosario Ferré, business woman; Melissa Marty, winner of Nuestra Belleza Latina 2008; and, Janina Irizarry, winner of Objetivo Fama, now a famous singer and actress...

Chapters

Notable members

See also
Concilio Interfraternitario Puertorriqueño de la Florida
Puerto Rican fraternities and sororities

References

Fraternities and sororities in Puerto Rico
1927 establishments in Puerto Rico
Student organizations established in 1927